Fusicocca-2,10(14)-diene synthase (EC 4.2.3.43, fusicoccadiene synthase, PaFS, PaDC4) is an enzyme with systematic name geranylgeranyl diphosphate-lyase (fusicocca-2,10(14)-diene-forming). This enzyme catalyses the following chemical reaction

 geranylgeranyl diphosphate  fusicocca-2,10(14)-diene + diphosphate

This multifunctional enzyme also has , farnesyltranstransferase, activity.

References

External links 
 

EC 4.2.3